Gaspar Gentile (born 16 February 1995) is an Argentine professional footballer who plays as a winger for UTC.

Career
Gentile began in the youth ranks of Newell's Old Boys. In 2016, Ferro Carril Oeste of Torneo Federal A signed Gentile. He made his debut against Tiro Federal on 7 February during a 3–0 victory. In the following October, Gentile scored for the first time in an away win over Defensores de Belgrano. July 2017 saw Gentile join Argentine Primera División side Temperley. His first professional football appearance arrived on 10 September in a 4–1 loss to Racing Club. Gentile was loaned out to Alvarado in July 2018. He returned to Temperley in June 2019, though would soon be signed permanently by Alvarado.

In February 2020, Gentile terminated his contract with Alvarado before, on 26 February, agreeing a move to Peru with Universidad San Martín. He made his first appearance in a goalless draw with Atlético Grau on 8 March. He remained for one season, scoring goals against Cusco, Sport Huancayo and Academia Cantolao as they placed eleventh in 2020. At the end of the year, on 9 December, Gentile penned terms to head across the division to UT Cajamarca for 2021.

Career statistics
.

References

External links

1995 births
Living people
People from Caseros Department
Argentine people of Italian descent
Argentine footballers
Association football forwards
Argentine expatriate footballers
Expatriate footballers in Peru
Argentine expatriate sportspeople in Peru
Torneo Federal A players
Argentine Primera División players
Primera Nacional players
Peruvian Primera División players
Club Atlético Temperley footballers
Club Atlético Alvarado players
Club Deportivo Universidad de San Martín de Porres players
Universidad Técnica de Cajamarca footballers
Sportspeople from Santa Fe Province